The Mummies of Guanajuato is a 1978 book which reprints Ray Bradbury's novelette, "The Next in Line", illustrated with photographs, by Archie Lieberman, of the actual mummies discovered in Guanajuato which inspired the story.  The story originally appeared in Bradbury's first book, Dark Carnival, in 1947.

References

External links
 
 

1978 short story collections
Short story collections by Ray Bradbury